Thomas Henry Coulter (April 21, 1911 – December 17, 2003) was a Canadian-American professional ice hockey defenceman who played two National Hockey League games for the Chicago Black Hawks during the 1933–34 NHL season as a way to pay for tuition as an engineer. He was brother to Arthur Coulter and was the first NHL player to play in an Australian ice hockey league, playing one game for St. George's IHC. Coulter also worked as CEO of the Chicago Association of Commerce and Industry for 27 years.

In addition to hockey, Coulter was listed as the 29th-fastest track and field athlete in the world in 1931.

Early life and education 
Coulter was born in Winnipeg, Manitoba, in 1911. Coulter moved to Pittsburgh to attend Carnegie Mellon University, where he earned a Bachelor of Science degree in engineering in 1933. He competed in the 1932 Olympic Games as a member of Canada's track team and then attended graduate school at the University of Chicago, receiving a master's degree in economics in 1935.

Career 
Coulter's business career began in 1935 and for the next 20 years was engaged with Chicago enterprises in manufacturing and consulting before becoming CEO of the Chicago Association of Commerce and Industry in 1954. It was at this point Coulter's vision for Chicago as a worldwide center for trade came into view. He organized and directed six major international trade fairs including a visit by Elizabeth II and Prince Philip, Duke of Edinburgh on the opening of the St. Lawrence Seaway.

He received the “Award of Merit” from Carnegie Mellon University for outstanding personal achievement in the field of business organization and the Citation for Public Service from the University of Chicago. His vision for Chicago will continue to be realized through scholarships he created and organizations he established, some of which have grown to be the largest of their kind in the country, including the Japan America society.

He served as the director of the Chicago-Tokyo Bank for many years. He also served as president of the Executives Club of Chicago (1948–1953) and the Sales and Marketing Executives Club of Chicago (1948–1956).

Personal life 
Coulter married Mary Alice in 1937. His brother, Art Coulter, was also a hockey player.

References

External links

1911 births
2003 deaths
Athletes (track and field) at the 1932 Summer Olympics
Canadian bankers
Canadian ice hockey defencemen
Canadian expatriate ice hockey players in Australia
Canadian male hurdlers
Chicago Blackhawks players
Cleveland Falcons players
Olympic track and field athletes of Canada
Ice hockey people from Winnipeg
Canadian emigrants to the United States